Wildstyle is an EP by American electronic music artist Bassnectar, released on October 19, 2010 on Amorphous Music. It was the focus of his 2010 Fall Tour.

Track listing

References

2010 albums
Bassnectar albums